Kaisa Helena Hietala (born 1971 in Ranua) is a Finnish business executive.

Graduated from the University of Oulu, she obtained an MPhil from the University of Cambridge.

She worked at the Renewable Products division at Neste, reaching the position of Executive Vice President.

In May 2021, with the backing of Engine No. 1, Hietala was elected to the board of directors of ExxonMobil, notably, one of the first environment-friendly board members of the Standard Oil descendant.

References

External links
 
 Kaisa Hietala at LinkedIn

1971 births
Living people
University of Oulu alumni
Alumni of the University of Cambridge
Finnish business executives
Neste people
Directors of ExxonMobil